The 1984 Enfield Southgate by-election was a parliamentary by-election held on 13 December 1984 for the House of Commons constituency of Enfield Southgate.

Previous MP 
The seat had become vacant on 12 October 1984 in tragic circumstances, when the constituency's Member of Parliament (MP) was killed by the Irish Republican Army in the Brighton hotel bombing.

Sir Anthony George Berry (12 February 1925 – 12 October 1984) was a Conservative MP for Enfield Southgate, and a Whip in Margaret Thatcher's government.

Sir Anthony Berry had been Southgate's MP since the 1964 general election. The constituency had been renamed Enfield Southgate in 1983.

Candidates 
Given the reason for the by-election, there was some discussion about the Labour Party and the Alliance not contesting the poll. However, in the end both opposition forces were represented in the list of candidates.

Nine candidates were nominated. The list below is set out in descending order of the number of votes received at the by-election.

 The Conservative candidate was Michael Denzil Xavier Portillo. Born in 1953, Portillo was a Special Adviser to the Chancellor of the Exchequer. He had contested Birmingham Perry Barr in the 1983 general election.Portillo won the by-election and went on to become a prominent political figure. He was serving as Secretary of State for Defence, when defeated in this seat at the 1997 general election. Portillo subsequently represented Kensington and Chelsea (1999-2005) and was an unsuccessful candidate for the Conservative Party leadership (2001), before retiring from politics to pursue a media career.
The Liberal Party candidate, representing the SDP–Liberal Alliance, was Timothy Willatt Slack. He was a former headmaster, born in 1928, who was Director of the Foreign Office International Conference Centre. Slack had contested the seat of Petersfield at both general elections in 1974.
 Representing the Labour Party was Winston Farouk Hamid (known as Peter Hamid). The Trinidad born Hamid was aged 52. He had lived in the UK for 31 years and was a member of Enfield Borough Council to which he had been elected in 1982.
 Andreas Polydorou was an Independent, who ran as a Turkish Troops Out of Cyprus candidate.
 Industrial chemist and Royal Navy veteran (1943-1946), James Wilfred Kershaw, stood on behalf of a far right group known as the Nationalist Party. Craig regarded Kershaw as a party candidate rather than an Independent.
 Raymond Edwin Shenton was an English National Party candidate, who advocated a far right policy. Craig regarded Shenton as an Independent.
 Iain Innes Burgess was an Independent candidate, whose ballot paper label was Abolish Greater London - Restore Middlesex Shire.  
 George Weiss stood for Captain Rainbow's Universal Party. Craig considered him an Independent.
 Miss Helen Mary Anscomb was an Independent who used the label Death off Roads: Freight on Rail.

Results 

Previous general election result

See also
 Enfield Southgate constituency
 List of United Kingdom by-elections (1979–2010)
 United Kingdom by-election records

References

Sources
 Britain Votes/Europe Votes By-Election Supplement 1983-, compiled and edited by F.W.S. Craig (Parliamentary Research Services 1985)

1984 elections in the United Kingdom
1984 in London
December 1984 events in the United Kingdom
By-elections to the Parliament of the United Kingdom in London constituencies
Elections in the London Borough of Enfield